Hypatopa funebra is a moth in the family Blastobasidae. It is found in North America, including Pennsylvania, Maryland, Maine and Florida.

References

Moths described in 1910
Hypatopa